The 1979 Garuda Fokker F28 crash occurred on 11 July 1979 when a Garuda Indonesian Airways Fokker F28 airliner on a domestic flight in Indonesia from Talang Betutu Airport, Palembang, to Polonia International Airport (now Soewondo Air Force Base), Medan, struck Mount Sibayak at  on approach to landing, with no survivors.

The aircraft had departed Palembang 80 minutes earlier and had been cleared for an approach to runway 05 at Medan Airport. The approach controller then asked them to maintain that height until after they had passed the NDB.

See also
 1982 Garuda Fokker F28 crash, involving the same type of plane and airline

References

External links 
 

Aviation accidents and incidents in 1979
Airliner accidents and incidents involving controlled flight into terrain
Accidents and incidents involving the Fokker F28
Aviation accidents and incidents in Indonesia
Garuda Indonesia accidents and incidents
1979 in Indonesia
July 1979 events in Asia
1979 disasters in Indonesia